The Armstrong Nugget is a gold nugget that was found June 19, 1913, by George Armstrong, at a placer mine near Susanville in Grant County, Oregon, United States. The nugget weighs 80.4 ounces. 
 
Today the nugget can be seen in a gold mining display at the U.S. Bank in Baker City.

References

Gold mining in the United States
Grant County, Oregon
History of Oregon
Baker City, Oregon
Mining in Oregon
Gold nuggets